A list of schools in Canada:

By province or territory
List of senior high schools in Alberta
List of schools in New Brunswick
List of schools in the Northwest Territories
List of schools in Nova Scotia
List of schools in Nunavut
List of high schools in Ontario
List of schools in Prince Edward Island
List of schools in Quebec
List of schools in Yukon
List of art schools in Quebec

By region
List of French public schools in Eastern Ontario
List of Waterloo Region, Ontario schools (educational institutions)
List of high schools in Windsor and Essex County, Ontario
List of English-language educational institutions in Quebec
List of Canada-accredited schools abroad

By city
List of educational institutions in Toronto
List of schools in London, Ontario
List of schools in Oakville, Ontario
List of schools in Ottawa (educational institutions)
List of schools of the Ottawa Catholic School Board (English Catholic schools)
List of schools of the Ottawa-Carleton District School Board (English public schools)
List of schools of the Conseil des écoles catholiques du Centre-Est (French Catholic schools)
List of schools of the Conseil des écoles publiques de l'Est de l'Ontario (French public schools)

See also
List of school districts in Canada